Treasure Island is a 1938 Soviet adventure film directed by Vladimir Vaynshtok and starring Osip Abdulov, Mikhail Klimov and Nikolai Cherkasov. It is an adaptation of Robert Louis Stevenson's novel Treasure Island. The film was one of several British literary classics turned into films in the Soviet Union during the era. A number of changes were made to introduce anti-British elements and to promote leninist-marxist ideology. The book's character of Jim Hawkins is transformed into a young woman named Jenny, and the characters are attempting to find the treasure in order to fund an Irish and anti-British rebellion. An English language version was directed by David Bradley.

Cast
 Klavdiya Pugachova as Jenny Hawkins
 Osip Abdulov as John Silver  
 Mikhail Klimov as Trelawney  
 Nikolai Cherkasov as Billy Bones 
 Aleksandr Bykov as Captain Smollett
 Iona Bij-Brodsky as George Mari
 Pyotr Galadzhev as Ben Gunn
 Aleksandr Levshin 
 Nikolai Michurin 
 Mikhail Tsaryov as Dr. Livesey
 Vladimir Yershov
 L. Meshcherin  
 V. Yakushenko

References

Bibliography
 Evgeny Dobrenko & Marina Balina. The Cambridge Companion to Twentieth-Century Russian Literature. Cambridge University Press, 2011.

External links

1938 films
Soviet historical adventure films
Soviet black-and-white films
1930s historical adventure films
Films set in Ireland
Treasure Island films
1930s Russian-language films
Films directed by Vladimir Vaynshtok